Pablo Cáceres Rodríguez (born 22 April 1985) is a Uruguayan professional footballer who plays as a defender.

Club career
Pablo Cáceres made 18 Bundesliga and five 2. Bundesliga appearances for MSV Duisburg until he joined Cypriot club Omonia.

In 2011, he signed for Mallorca who play in La Liga.

References

External links
 

1985 births
Living people
Footballers from Montevideo
Uruguayan footballers
Uruguayan expatriate footballers
Association football defenders
Danubio F.C. players
FC Twente players
Bundesliga players
2. Bundesliga players
MSV Duisburg players
Cypriot First Division players
AC Omonia players
Argentine Primera División players
Club Atlético Tigre footballers
La Liga players
RCD Mallorca players
Serie A players
Torino F.C. players
Rangers de Talca footballers
Atlético Tucumán footballers
Club Puebla players
Chilean Primera División players
Uruguayan expatriate sportspeople in the Netherlands
Uruguayan expatriate sportspeople in Germany
Uruguayan expatriate sportspeople in Cyprus
Uruguayan expatriate sportspeople in Argentina
Uruguayan expatriate sportspeople in Chile
Uruguayan expatriate sportspeople in Spain
Uruguayan expatriate sportspeople in Italy
Expatriate footballers in the Netherlands
Expatriate footballers in Germany
Expatriate footballers in Cyprus
Expatriate footballers in Argentina
Expatriate footballers in Chile
Expatriate footballers in Spain
Expatriate footballers in Italy